Noa Nayacakalou is a Fijian rugby league footballer who represented Fiji at the 1995 World Cup. 

He played four tests for Fiji between 1994 and 1995 while in the lower grades with the Penrith Panthers.

References

Living people
Fijian rugby league players
Fiji national rugby league team players
Rugby league five-eighths
I-Taukei Fijian people
Year of birth missing (living people)